Summer Skin may refer to:

 Summer Skin (song), a song by Death Cab for Cutie
 Summer Skin (film), a 1961 Argentine film